Ilūkstes apriņķis was a historic county of the Courland Governorate and of the Republic of Latvia. Its capital was Ilūkste (Illuxt), but the most populous settlement was Grīva (Griwa-Semgallen) immediately south of Daugavpils (Dünaburg).

History 
Initially, the Captaincy of Illuxt was as a subdivision of the Duchy of Courland and Semigallia. In 1795, the Duchy was incorporated into the Russian Empire, and in 1819 Illuxt County (Kreis Illuxt) became one of the ten counties of the Courland Governorate. It was forming a wedge between Vilna (later Kovno) and Vitebsk governorates.

After the establishment of the Republic of Latvia in 1918, the Ilūkstes apriņķis existed until 1949, when the Council of Ministers of the Latvian SSR split it into the newly created districts (rajons) of Grīva (dissolved in 1955), Aknīste (dissolved in 1956) and Ilūkste (dissolved in 1962 and merged with the Daugavpils District).

Demographics
At the time of the Russian Empire Census of 1897, Kreis Illuxt had a population of 66,461. Of these, 28.5% spoke Latvian, 17.3% Belarusian, 17.1% Polish, 15.2% Russian, 10.5% Lithuanian and 9.6% Yiddish as their native language.

References

External links

 
Uezds of Courland Governorate